Aimee Mullins is an American athlete, actress, and public speaker. She was born with a medical condition that resulted in the amputation of both of her legs beneath the knee. She is the first amputee to compete against able-bodied athletes in National Collegiate Athletic Association events, and competed in the Paralympics in 1996 in Atlanta. In 1999, she began modeling, and, in 2002, she began an acting career. She has periodically spoken at conferences, including TED Talks.

Early life and education

Mullins was born in Allentown, Pennsylvania to an Irish father Bernard Mullins from Crusheen, County Clare, Ireland and mother Bernadette Mullins. She was born with fibular hemimelia (missing fibula bones). As a result, both her legs were amputated below the knee when she was one year old. Her parents were told she would likely use a wheelchair for the rest of her life and never walk, but by the age of two she had learned to walk with prosthetic legs. She took up sports and acting at an early age. 

Mullins attended high school at Parkland High School in South Whitehall Township, Pennsylvania.

She attended Georgetown University's School of Foreign Service on a full scholarship, where she competed against able-bodied athletes in National Collegiate Athletic Association (NCAA) Division I track and field events. She is the first female amputee in history to compete in the NCAA and the first amputee in history (male or female) to compete in NCAA Division I track and field.

Career
Mullins competed in the Paralympics in 1996 in Atlanta, running the T42-46 class 100-meter sprint in 17.01 seconds and jumped 3.14 meters in the F42-46 class long jump. She retired from competitive track and field in 1998.

Philanthropy 
She was elected to represent American female athletes from 2007 to 2009 as Women's Sports Foundation president; the organization was founded by sports pioneer Billie Jean King. She remains a member of both its board of trustees and its athlete advisory panel for the Women Sports Foundation. Sports Illustrated magazine named her one of the "Coolest Girls in Sports". Mullins was included as one of the "Greatest Women of the 20th Century" in the Women's Museum in Dallas prior to the museum's closure.

Along with Teresa Edwards, Mullins was appointed Chef de Mission for the United States at the 2012 Summer Olympics and 2012 Summer Paralympics in London.

In 2012, she was appointed by then-Secretary of State Hillary Clinton to the State Department's Council to Empower Women and Girls Through Sports.

Modeling
In 1999, she modelled for British fashion designer Alexander McQueen, opening his London show on a pair of hand-carved wooden prosthetic legs made from solid ash, with integral boots. She is able to change her height between 5 ft 8in and 6 ft 1in by changing her legs. She was on billboards in the U.S. as part of the "25 Years of Non-Uniform Thinking" campaign by Kenneth Cole in 2009. She was a face of L'Oréal Paris and was appointed a global L'Oréal ambassador in 2011.

Film and television
In 2002, she starred in Matthew Barney's art film Cremaster 3 as six different characters, including a cheetah woman. Her other film and television credits include roles in World Trade Center, Poirot (S9:E1 Five Little Pigs), Naked in a Fishbowl, Quid Pro Quo, and Marvelous. In the River of Fundament, she continued collaboration with Matthew Barney, starring as Isis in performances both live and filmed since 2007 and released in early 2014.  She has performed roles in Young Ones, The Being Experience, Rob the Mob, and the debut feature Appropriate Behavior.  She acted in Crossbones, an NBC television show, and in the Netflix series Stranger Things.

She appeared on The Colbert Report on April 15, 2010, and declared having 12 pairs of prosthetic legs, including some "in museums".

Speaking
Mullins  appears periodically as a speaker on topics related to body, identity, design, and innovation. Her TED conference talks have been translated into 42 languages. She is credited as being one of the speakers that inspired Chris Anderson to purchase the TED conference from Richard Saul Wurman. She was named a TED "All-Star" in 2014.

Personal life
Mullins began dating English actor Rupert Friend in 2013. They got engaged in 2014 and married in 2016.

Filmography

Films

Television

Awards
In 2017, she was inducted into the National Women's Hall of Fame.

On May 4, 2018, she received an honorary degree and gave the commencement address at Northeastern University in Boston, MA.

References

External links

 
 
 
Aimee Mullins interview with SELF

Living people
21st-century American actresses
Actresses from Allentown, Pennsylvania
American amputees
American female long jumpers
American female sprinters
American film actresses
American people of Irish descent
Athletes (track and field) at the 1996 Summer Paralympics
Female models from Allentown, Pennsylvania
Models with disabilities
Parkland High School (Pennsylvania) alumni
Paralympic track and field athletes of the United States
Sportspeople from Allentown, Pennsylvania
Sportspeople with limb difference
Sprinters with limb difference
Walsh School of Foreign Service alumni
Women's Sports Foundation executives
Year of birth missing (living people)